Anatrisauropus is an ichnogenus of dinosaur footprint, possibly belonging to a saurischian. It has only been discovered in Lesotho (Molteno Formation and Karoo Basin). Three ichnospecies are known: A. camisardi, A. ginsburgi and A. hereroensis; all of which were named by Paul Ellenberger between 1965 and 1972.

See also

 List of dinosaur ichnogenera

References

Reptile trace fossils